O.M.G.! is the debut album of British dubstep musician Rusko. It was released 3 May 2010 in the UK and 4 May in the US. The album contains the singles "Woo Boost" and "Hold On".

The song "Woo Boost" was featured on the soundtrack of the commercially successful 2011 video game Saints Row: The Third.

Track listing

References

External links
 Woo Boost video

2010 debut albums
Rusko (musician) albums